Burns Cove is a bay in the U.S. state of Washington.

Burns Cove has the name of Henry Burns, an early settler.

References

Landforms of Thurston County, Washington
Bays of Washington (state)